Pinnick is a surname. Notable people with the surname include:

Amaju Pinnick (born 1970), Nigerian football administrator
Chris Pinnick (born 1953), American guitarist and songwriter
Doug Pinnick (born 1950), American musician

See also
Pinnock
Winnick